Zsolt Bohács (born 22 March 1964) is a Hungarian sprint canoeist and marathon canoeist who competed from the late 1980s to the mid-1990s. He won six medals at the ICF Canoe Sprint World Championships with three golds (C-1 10000 m: 1990, 1991, 1993) and three silvers (C-1 10000 m: 1987, 1989; C-4 500 m: 1990).

He was elected to the Member of Parliament for Szeged (Csongrád County Constituency III) as a candidate of Fidesz in 2010. He became a member of the Constitutional, Judicial and Standing Orders Committee. He was appointed Chairman of the Committee on Sport and Tourism on 1 March 2013.

References

1964 births
Living people
Hungarian male canoeists
Hungarian jurists
Fidesz politicians
Members of the National Assembly of Hungary (2010–2014)
ICF Canoe Sprint World Championships medalists in Canadian
20th-century Hungarian people